Mountjoy Blount  may refer to:

 Mountjoy Blount, 1st Earl of Newport (1597–1666)
 Mountjoy Blount, 2nd Earl of Newport (1630–1675)